Jáchal is a department of the province of San Juan (Argentina). It is located north of the same by making, characterized by its first level agricultural production, which emphasizes the planting of onion. The city is also known as the cradle of tradition.

Toponymy 
The name of the department is a native language meaning river of the groves or land or district metals.

Geography  
 
Its boundaries are:

 To the north the Province of La Rioja, Argentina 
 To the south with the department Ullum, Albardón, Angaco and Caucete 
 East: the Valle Fértil 
 To the west with the Iglesia

The department has a relief Jáchal has two distinct structures. The mountains belonging to the edge of the foothills in the direction from north to south, are located to the west forming a natural boundary with the Iglesia Department, highlighting the hills, Colorado, Alto Mayo, Yellow and Glen Wells. The Fertile Valley Serani surrounding the eastern valleys separating Jáchal and Huaco.

From the standpoint of the department is irrigodo water by rivers Jáchal, second in importance to the provincial level, supplying the homonymous valley, located in the center west of the department. The river irrigates the valley Huaco same name and is where the dam the Cauquenes is one of the mirrors of water present in the apartment next to the diverter Pachimoco and the Bermejo River, this river is temporary and that feeds on rainwater.

The flora is composed of jarillas, challenge you, carob, chañares, booby bird, and so on. In the case of the fauna are distinguished fox, rhea, condor, Chun, partridges, guanacos and silversides, as well as various reptiles and arachnids, are the local fauna.

Economy  
 
Jáchal's economy is centered on the agriculture, highlighting numerous plantations of vegetable s, such as onion, the third product in the province of San Juan most exported after the vine and olive. Variasdas also produced a fruit s (with a predominance of quince), olives and develops a significant production of alfalfa.

From 2007 to date the amount of land planted with onions dwindled by 42%, passed 1,122 hectares registered in the last census of Hydraulics, the existing 650 hectares, according to figures from the Association, while the surface with alfalfa increased by 63% from 1584 hectares in 2007 to about 2,500 today. 
Thus the productive profile of Jáchal occurs much more diversified with the increased area of alfalfa and to a lesser extent, stands the tomato. 
In 2008 a company multinational dedicated to mining, successfully launched in this jurisdiction a mine, from which to draw gold. It is located above the 2,000 m. It is the Project Gualcamayo, is located north of the department, in the area of the Quebrada del Diablo foothills area of San Juan. This is a site located only 10 kilometers from the National Route 40, road San Jose, Jáchal. This is a holding open with crushing of ore that is then leachate with cyanide and subsequent precipitation with activated carbon. This will provide doré metal bars, then go to refinery

Tourism  
San José de Jáchal: In the Midwest of the Valley Jáchal is the city of San Jose de Jáchal, a quiet town with long streets connecting the center with the environment of green fields, mountains and turbulent Jáchal offers places like San Jose Archdiocesan Shrine national historic monument and several museums. During the month of November is celebrated around the Provincial Party Tradition, where he performed shows with local and national performers, crafts shows, selling local foods and so on. 
Also from San Jose, Jáchal can begin to several different trips, for example, the old flour mills in the area. 

 Cauquenes: Reservoir dam is located at 1,100 m. The reservoir, also known as Dam Dam Huaco or lysosomes, is the ideal place to share a day outdoors in a setting of spectacular scenery and amazing tranquility, the lake invites water sports and admire the variety of flora and fauna. The water mirror is especially famous among anglers for the presence of the coveted silversides.

Mogna: This town is located south of the province, is home to one of the most popular celebrations of Jáchal mass. The Feast of Santa Barbara Mogna performed on 4 December and more than 20,000 calls faithful to ride from San Juan to honor the Virgin. The festivities include the participation of the Bishop of San Juan. The presentation of important folk artists and to sample regional foods are the main attractions of the festival.

 Flour Mills: With more than two centuries of existence, these old machines stand the test of time to witness the economic development achieved by Jáchal the eighteenth century. The mills stand as symbols of a prosperous past. At that time, flour production in the province not only supplied the local market but also those across the country, including Buenos Aires, Cordoba and Tucuman.

Because of their undeniable value and in order to ensure their preservation, Mills Huaco Jáchal near the Church and others were declared National Historic Monument. The various parts made possible today can be appreciated in all its glory. 
A visit to Jáchal can not overlook the trip to the mill circuit, an unforgettable journey that will leave a valuable cultural learning. 
It is interesting to know the sardines, which is still preserved wooden machinery of carob, Perez and Reyes mill, which dates back to colonial times.

 Mill Sardiña 
Features: One of the most prominent joint edilicios still active. In the original building were added as the room for other races to be queuing for milling. This mill still lists rustic machinery used to move the "teeth" or Prechas producing grinding wheel by a large (6 m in diameter)

 Mill Garcia 
Features: true regional production unit, forms a complex containing the owner's house with Italianate facade of restrained ornamentation, the miller's house, attached to this one makes of noodles.

 Jáchal River Gorge: The spectacular canyon, which rises 30 meters above the river level Jáchal, offers the most beautiful and impressive scenery for the practice of rafting and the kayaking. The narrow pass is combined with the unstoppable movement to promote abundant water rapids and waterfalls. With a top speed of 30 to 40 km/h, allows the rubber boats sink in this challenging walk.

Other attractions can be highlighted Huachi Huerta, a place that has landscapes of great beauty, surrounded by fruit trees product of a special climate NICRO, which predispose the visitor to live days of peace and tranquility in touch with nature. The garden is forested with walnut trees, olive trees, grapevines and fig trees and allows the practices of school children and nearby homes. The calm awaken the senses of the visitor can enjoy nature and the ideal conditions provided by the beneficial micro-climate. The right place to relax, walk and observe the different species in the flora and fauna. Villa Mercedes, 15 km from the city of Jáchal, the largest population center north jáchallero has valuable attractions such as: Church of La Merced, a community complex that offers services with supply, health, camping and resort to the loom and Crafts Factory of regional products: pancakes jachalleras and Camping Municipal "The Nursery" located on the RN 150, it has health services, tables and barbecues

Departments of San Juan Province, Argentina